José María Mora y Daza (born 1820 in Xalapa) was a Mexican clergyman and bishop for the Roman Catholic Archdiocese of Xalapa. He was ordained in 1851. He was appointed bishop in 1870. He subsequently became bishop of Tlaxcala. He died in 1887.

References 

1820 births
1887 deaths
Mexican Roman Catholic bishops
People from Xalapa